Blastobasis lososi is a moth in the family Blastobasidae that is endemic to Fiji.

The forewings are pale brown intermixed with brown scales. The hindwings are pale greyish brown.

Etymology
The species is named in honour of Joseph O. Losos.

References

Moths described in 2002
Endemic fauna of Fiji
Blastobasis
Moths of Fiji